Hollesley Bay may refer to:

 Hollesley Bay (HM Prison), near Woodbridge, Suffolk
 HMS Hollesley Bay (K614) a Bay-class anti-aircraft frigate of the British Royal Navy
 Hollesley Bay, Suffolk, part of the coast of Suffolk near the village of Hollesley